Your Obedient Servant is a play by Sumner Locke Elliott. It was first performed at Sydney's Independent Theatre directed by Doris Fitton. Coralie Campbell produced a further season of the play at Sydney's Genesian Theatre in 1969.

References

External links
Your Obedient Servant at AusStage

Australian plays
1943 plays